Hiroki Maeda may refer to:

 Hiroki Maeda (footballer, born 1994), forward for Verspah Oita
 Hiroki Maeda (footballer, born 1998), defender for Giravanz Kitakyushu